Dmitrij Alexejevič Jaškin (born 23 March 1993) is a Russian-born Czech professional ice hockey player currently playing with SKA Saint Petersburg of the Kontinental Hockey League (KHL). He played five seasons for the St Louis Blues and one season with the Washington Capitals and Arizona Coyotes of the National Hockey League (NHL). Jaškin was selected first overall in the 2010 KHL Junior Draft by Sibir Novosibirsk, and was drafted by the Blues in the second round, 41st overall, in the 2011 NHL Entry Draft.

Early life
His father, Alexej Jaškin, was a professional defenceman for Khimik Voskresensk in the Soviet Championship League and later Vsetín in the Czech Extraliga. Dmitrij and his older brother Michail started in the Vsetín youth system while their father played there, and they both transferred to Slavia Praha in 2008. The family has lived in the Czech Republic since 1993, when Dmitrij was eight months old.

Playing career
He first played professionally for Slavia Praha of the Czech Extraliga for two seasons. Jaškin could have played in the 2011 IIHF World U20 Championship, but suffered a knee injury in an Extraliga game on 21 November, which sidelined him for six weeks and caused him to miss the tournament. He registered 10 points in 33 Extraliga games during the season as a 17-year-old, ranking him second among junior-aged players in the league.

After being selected by the Moncton Wildcats in the 2012 CHL Import Draft, Jaškin announced that he would play for the QMJHL team in the 2012–13 season in order to increase his chances of playing in the NHL.

On 3 April 2013, he signed a three-year, entry-level contract with the St. Louis Blues, and was assigned to the Chicago Wolves. He was recalled to the Blues roster on 9 April.

During the 2013–14 season, on 28 December 2013, he scored his first NHL goal against Antti Raanta of the Chicago Blackhawks. On 3 July 2015, the Blues re-signed him to a one-year deal. Following 2015–16 season, on 16 June 2016, Jaškin re-signed with the Blues to a two-year, $2 million deal.

On 2 October 2018, Jaškin was claimed off waivers by the Washington Capitals.

Jaškin as a free agent from the Capitals, opted to pause his NHL career and returned to Russia in signing a one-year deal with HC Dynamo Moscow of the KHL on 22 August 2019. Making his KHL debut in the 2019–20 season and benefiting from an increased role with Dynamo, Jaškin was leaned on offensively recording 63 points in 58 regular season games. His 31 goals set a new franchise single KHL season record and he was signed to an improved two-year contract extension on 17 April 2020.

After two highly productive seasons with HC Dynamo Moscow, Jaškin returned to North America as a free agent, agreeing to a lucurative one-year, $3.2 million contract with the Arizona Coyotes on July 28, 2021. Jaškin continued to struggle to make an impact at the NHL level with a poorly performing Coyotes team. Through his first 12 games, he registered a single assist before suffering an injury in a game against the Nashville Predators on November 13. Following an illegal hit by Predators defenseman Mark Borowiecki, he was expected to be out of action long-term and was placed on the injured reserve. Ultimately Jaškin did not appear in another game with the Coyotes.

As a free agent, Jaškin returned to the KHL and was signed to a one-year contract after his rights were traded from Dynamo Moscow to SKA Saint Petersburg on 25 July 2022.

Career statistics

Regular season and playoffs

International

See also
 List of first overall KHL draft picks

References

External links
 

1993 births
Living people
Arizona Coyotes players
Chicago Wolves players
Czech ice hockey right wingers
HC Dynamo Moscow players
HC Slavia Praha players
Moncton Wildcats players
Naturalized citizens of the Czech Republic
Sportspeople from Omsk
Russian emigrants to the Czech Republic
SKA Saint Petersburg players
Ice hockey people from Prague
St. Louis Blues draft picks
St. Louis Blues players
Washington Capitals players
Czech expatriate ice hockey players in the United States
Russian ice hockey right wingers
Czech expatriate ice hockey players in Canada